Abdel Fattah Abdelrahman al-Burhan (born 11 July 1960) is a Sudanese politician and Sudanese Army general who is the de facto head of state of Sudan as the commander-in-chief of the Sudanese Armed Forces after leading a coup d'état in October 2021 that deposed Prime Minister Abdalla Hamdok.

Al-Burhan was the former chairman of the Sovereignty Council of Sudan, the country's collective head of state, which was established following the Sudanese Revolution in 2019 to guide a Sudanese transition to democracy. After the military seized power in the October 2021 coup, al-Burhan dissolved the Sovereignty Council, which previously shared power between the country's military and civilians. The 2020 Juba Agreement allowed al-Burhan to continue to lead the Sovereignty Council for another 20 months, rather than stepping down as planned in February 2021. Until August 2019, he was also the Chairman of the Transitional Military Council after former Chairman Ahmed Awad Ibn Auf resigned and transferred control in April 2019. He was formerly the General Inspector of the Sudanese Armed Forces.

In May 2019, al-Burhan's first international trip was to Egypt to meet Abdel Fattah el-Sisi. His second visit was to the United Arab Emirates.

Early life and education 
Abdel Fattah al-Burhan was born in 1960 in the village of Gandatu in northern Sudan, to a Sufi family. Al-Burhan studied elementary and intermediate level in his village school, and later moved to Shendi to complete his education before joining the Sudanese Military College among the 31st batch.

Military career
After graduating from the Military Academy, al-Burhan worked in Khartoum, as part of the Sudanese army, and participated in the fighting fronts in the Darfur war and in the Second Sudanese Civil War in South Sudan and other regions. He later traveled to Egypt and then to Jordan to receive training courses in his military field until in 2018 he was appointed commander of the ground forces of the army.

Al-Burhan held several positions throughout his career as he began as a soldier with the Border Guard Forces and later became commander of this force before becoming Deputy Chief of Staff of the Ground Forces Operations and then Chief of Staff of the Sudanese Army in February 2018 before he served as Inspector General of the Army for a period of time. By 26 February 2019, during the massive protests that swept the country and demanded the fall of Omar al-Bashir's regime, al-Burhan was elevated to the rank of lieutenant general.

Chairman of the Transitional Military Council

Shortly after his appointment, al-Burhan ordered the release of all jailed prisoners who had been arrested by his predecessor, Omar al-Bashir, in a televised address.

Khartoum massacre 

In early June 2019, following al-Burhan's and Dagalo's visits to the Egyptian, UAE and Saudi leaders, the Sudanese Security Forces and Rapid Support Forces, including Janjaweed militias, led by al-Burhan and his deputy cracked down on peaceful protests in Sudan, starting with the 3 June Khartoum massacre. Human rights groups said that peaceful protesters were killed and about forty of the bodies were thrown in the river Nile, hundreds were tortured, violated and raped in the streets of Khartoum.

Al-Burhan's talks with the opposition on forming a combined government were then cancelled. During the days that followed, the TMC arrested several of the opposition leaders.

Iyad el-Baghdadi interpreted the decision-making by the TMC under al-Burhan's leadership as being strongly influenced by the general context of the Saudi, UAE and Egyptian leaders being afraid of democratic movements. Mahmoud Elmutasim, a political activist and doctor who graduated from the University of Khartoum, similarly stated that Saudi Arabia and the UAE are opposed to the existence of democracies in the Middle East, since if "the idea of democracy itself [should] ever take root, or become widespread in the Middle East," then it would constitute a threat to the governmental systems of Saudi Arabia and the UAE.

Internet shutdown 
Several human rights organisations including Human Rights Watch (HRW) condemned the al-Burhan-led TMC for shutting down the internet in June 2019. A spokesperson, Shamseldin Kabbashi, stated that the internet would be shut down for a long time because it represented a threat to national security. The move was described by HRW as a "gross violation of human rights". International media saw this as a sign of dictatorship and condemned the act. Many see it as an attempt to hide what al-Burhan's allied militia, known as the Janjaweed, were doing in Khartoum and to delay uploading evidence of the violations that took place on 3 June 2019 and in the days that followed.

Civilian government negotiations

Numerous protesters asked for a civilian government. On Saturday 13 April 2019, al-Burhan announced that a civilian government would soon be established. Al-Burhan promised that the transitional period would take a maximum of two years. Negotiations started to take place with the opposition leaders to achieve this.

In late May 2019, al-Burhan visited the Egyptian president Abdel Fattah el-Sisi and the de facto ruler of the United Arab Emirates, Mohammed bin Zayed Al Nahyan. Iyad el-Baghdadi, a human rights activist who became famous during the Arab Spring, later interpreted these visits (together with a visit by TMC deputy leader Dagalo to Mohammed bin Salman in Saudi Arabia) as encouragements for the TMC to cancel negotiations with the opposition. This comment by Iyad el-Baghdadi and recent developments and his ties to the Egyptian brotherhood which he established long ago when he studied in Egypt has led to the popular belief that al-Burhan has no interest to lead Sudan to a democratic and civilian state. Despite his promise to establish a civilian government by February 2021 as demanded by numerous protesters, his group seems to consistently isolate the civilian government led by Hamdok in key government decisions.

Chairman of the Transitional Sovereignty Council 

On 25 October 2021, al-Burhan led the October 2021 Sudanese coup d'état to overthrow the civilian government of Prime Minister Abdalla Hamdok. On 21 November 2021, all political prisoners were freed and Abdalla Hamdok was reinstated as prime minister as part of an agreement with the civilian political parties. Hamdok was also allowed to return leading the transitional government.

On 4 December 2021, al-Burhan told Reuters in an interview that the Sudanese military will "exit politics" following the elections scheduled for July 2023, stating, "When a government is elected, I don't think the army, the armed forces, or any of the security forces will participate in politics. This is what we agreed on and this is the natural situation."

On 9 December 2021, al-Burhan warned of possible measures against foreign diplomatic missions for their alleged incitement against the Sudanese army. He also reiterated his commitment to the political agreement struck with Prime Minister Hamdok in November 2021. On December 20 2021, al-Burhan voiced his support for Hamdok, adding that recent appointments had been made as the result of co-ordination between him and the prime minister and in line with the November 21st 2021 political agreement.

On 31 December 2021, in a speech, al-Burhan said he was committed to “building all the institutions of transitional government and holding free, fair, and transparent elections at their scheduled time", in July 2023.

On 2 January 2022 Abdalla Hamdok resigned from his post of prime minister and Osman Hussein was sworned in as acting prime minister.

On 4 July 2022, it was reported that al-Burhan mentioned the army will withdraw from the ongoing political talks and will allow political and revolutionary groups to form a transitional civilian government. This statement followed recent pro-democracy protests where 117 people were killed.

References

Living people
People from River Nile (state)
Sudanese lieutenant generals
Members of the Sovereignty Council of Sudan
Genocide perpetrators
Leaders who took power by coup
1961 births